Terény is a village in Nógrád county, Hungary.

Geography 
The village is situated 20 km south of Balassagyarmat, in the valley of Szanda creek, 95 km from Budapest.

History 
Terény was first mentioned as Teryan on a diploma during the Árpád dynasty, in 1274.

During the Middle Ages, Terény was referred to as Vásáros-Terjén (Terjén having a fair) on certificates and had the privileges of a city.

Notable residents 
The most notable person from Terény is Albert Szent-Györgyi, a Hungarian physiologist, Nobel Prize winner in Physiology or Medicine in 1937. He spent his childhood in Kiskérpuszta in Terény.

References

 :hu:Szent-Györgyi Albert

Populated places in Nógrád County